Codalithia is a genus of moths of the family Noctuidae. The genus was erected by Jeremy Daniel Holloway in 1979.

Species
Codalithia quincuncialis Holloway, 1979 New Caledonia
Codalithia subtilis Holloway, 1979 New Caledonia

References

Acontiinae